This is a list of South Dakota Coyotes football players in the NFL Draft.

Key

Selections

References

South Dakota

South Dakota Coyotes NFL Draft